Eugnosta beevorana is a species of moth of the family Tortricidae. It is found in Arizona and California.

The wingspan is 18–21 mm. Adults have been recorded on wing from December to March.

References

Moths described in 1940
Eugnosta